John Insley Blair Larned (October 5, 1883 – December 3, 1955) was a suffragan bishop of the Episcopal Diocese of Long Island, serving from 1929 to 1946.

Early life and education
John Insley Blair Larned was born on October 3, 1883 in Chicago, Illinois, the son of Walter Cranston Larned and Emma Locke Scribner. He was educated at the Lake Forest Academy in Lake Forest, Illinois and The Hill School in Pottstown, Pennsylvania. In 1905 he graduated with a Bachelor of Arts from Harvard College. He graduated with a Postgraduate degree from the Massachusetts Institute of Technology in 1908. Afterwards he studied at the Episcopal Theological School in Cambridge, Massachusetts from where he graduated with a Bachelor of Divinity in 1911. He was awarded a Doctor of Divinity from Trinity College in Hartford, Connecticut in 1935 and a Doctor of Laws from Hobart College in 1946.

Ordained Ministry
Larned was ordained a deacon in 1911 and a priest in 1912. He then served as curate at Saint John's Church in Staten Island, New York City between 1911 and 1913 before becoming rector of Saint John's Church in Globe, Arizona. In 1916 he moved to Kingston, New York to become rector of Saint John's Church. Between 1918 and 1922 he served as Dean of the Pro-Cathedral of the Nativity in Bethlehem, Pennsylvania. Later he became rector of Saint John's Church in Yonkers, New York and then in 1925 left to become general secretary in the field department of the National Council of the Episcopal Church, where he remained till 1929.

Episcopacy
Larned was elected Suffragan Bishop of Long Island on November 14, 1928 in the Cathedral of the Incarnation in Garden City, New York. He was consecrated on February 11, 1929 by Presiding Bishop John Gardner Murray. He was named for American industrialist John Insley Blair. He was also Bishop-in-charge of American Episcopal Churches in Europe between 1947 and 1953. He died in Massachusetts General Hospital on December 3, 1955.

References 

1881 births
1955 deaths
Episcopal Divinity School alumni
Massachusetts Institute of Technology alumni
Harvard College alumni
20th-century American Episcopalians
Episcopal bishops of Long Island